Eine deutsche Revolution is a 1982 West German drama film directed by Helmut Herbst. It was entered into the 32nd Berlin International Film Festival.

Cast
In alphabetical order
 Marquard Bohm as Preuninger, prison guard
 Bazon Brock as Hofrat von Stein
 Peter O. Chotjewitz as Gravellinus
 
 Jörg Falkenstein as Zeuner
  as Kuhl
 Brunhild Geipel as Amalie Weidig
 Gregor Hansen as Georg Büchner
 Ernst A. Hartung as Dr. Stegmayer
  as Minnigerode
 
 Emanuel Schmied as Hofrat Georgi
 Heidi Spiesser as Minni
 Siegfried Unruh as Scharmann
  as Hofrat Schiffer
 Franz Wittich as Friedrich Ludwig Weidig

References

External links

1982 films
1980s historical films
German historical films
West German films
1980s German-language films
Films directed by Helmut Herbst
Films set in the 1830s
Films based on German novels
Films based on historical novels
1980s German films